There are 36 counties in the U.S. State of Oregon. The Oregon Constitution does not explicitly provide for county seats; Article VI, covering the "Administrative Department" of the state of Oregon, simply states that:
All county and city officers shall keep their respective offices at such places therein, and perform such duties, as may be prescribed by law.

More details on the etymologies of Oregon county names and place names in general are documented in Oregon Geographic Names. Oregon's postal abbreviation is OR and its FIPS state code is 41.

County information
The Federal Information Processing Standard (FIPS) code, which is used by the United States government to uniquely identify counties, is provided with each entry. The FIPS code for each county links to census data for that county.

|}

See also 

Umpqua County, Oregon (historic)
 Oregon locations by per capita income
List of U.S. county secession proposals#Oregon
Lists of Oregon-related topics

References

External links 

 Historic county boundaries from the Oregon Archives
 
 Map of counties adjusted for population

Oregon, counties in
 
Counties